The Schenley Farms Historic District, also referred to as the Schenley Farms–Oakland Civic District, is a historic district listed on the National Register of Historic Places that is located in the Oakland section of Pittsburgh, Pennsylvania, United States.

It comprises two separately designated City of Pittsburgh historic districts: the Oakland Civic Center Historic District consisting of publicly and privately owned institutional buildings, and the adjacent Schenley Farms Historic District consisting mainly of a planned residential development of the early 20th Century.  The Schenley Farms Historic District is roughly bounded by Forbes Avenue including the Carnegie Museums of Pittsburgh on the south; South Dithridge and North Bellefield on the east, extending to include St. Paul's Cathedral and Rectory on Fifth Avenue and North Craig Street; Bigelow Boulevard, Andover Road, and Bryn Mawr Road on the northwest; and Thackeray Street through to Fifth Avenue on the southwest.

Noted for its late 19th And 20th Century Revivals architecture, it is home to a large portion of the campus of the University of Pittsburgh.  The district comprises 154 contributing buildings, 31 of which are cultural or institutional buildings and 123 of which are residences in the northwest portion of the district. The historic district is a noted example of community planning and development following the City Beautiful movement that guided city planning and urban design in the United States from the mid-1890s through the first decade of the 20th century. The City Beautiful movement favored boulevards, parks, and formal civic buildings in the beaux-arts style.

In 1905, Franklin Nicola put forth a development  plan in the City Beautiful style for Oakland, which included civic, social, residential, and educational zones along Bigelow Boulevard which ran through the heart of the neighborhood. The proposal centered on a series of monumental buildings created in styles evoking ancient Greece and the Italian Renaissance. Although Nicola's plan was not fully implemented, including a never-constructed Oakland town hall, it produced such landmarks as the Soldiers and Sailors Memorial Hall, the Masonic Temple (now the University of Pittsburgh's Alumni Hall), and the Pittsburgh Athletic Association.

Other major landmark buildings were added to the historic district after the pursuit of Nicola's designs had ended, including the landmark Cathedral of Learning and Heinz Memorial Chapel of the University of Pittsburgh and Mellon Institute. Contributing  buildings in the historic district date from 1880 to 1979. A contributing building, the University Place Office Building, was razed in 2011.

Historic district sites

Book References

References

City of Pittsburgh historic designations
Pittsburgh History & Landmarks Foundation Historic Landmarks
School buildings on the National Register of Historic Places in Pennsylvania
Historic districts in Pittsburgh
Historic districts on the National Register of Historic Places in Pennsylvania
National Register of Historic Places in Pittsburgh